Captain Arthur Cameron Corbett, 3rd Baron Rowallan (17 December 1919 – 24 June 1993), was a British aristocrat most notable for successfully having his second marriage annulled in 1970 on the grounds that his wife April Ashley, a transgender woman, was legally a man. This case is known as Corbett v Corbett.

Early life
Arthur Cameron Corbett was born on 17 December 1919 to Thomas Godfrey Polson Corbett, 2nd Baron Rowallan (1895–1977), who was Chief Scout of the British Commonwealth and Empire and served as Governor of Tasmania from 1959 to 1963, and Gwyn Melvyn Grimond, daughter of Joseph Bowman Grimond of St Andrews, Fife.  His maternal uncle was Jo Grimond, Baron Grimond, the leader of the Liberal Party 1956–67.

He was one of six children born to his parents. One of his four brothers was killed in action in 1944. He was educated at Eton.

Peerage
He succeeded his father, Thomas Corbett, as the 3rd Baron Rowallan on 30 November 1977. Upon his death in 1993, his eldest son, John Corbett, 4th Baron Rowallan, succeeded to his title, Baron Rowallan.

Personal life

First marriage and children
In 1945, he married Eleanor Mary Boyle. They had four children:

 John Polson Cameron Corbett, 4th Baron Rowallan (born 8 March 1947)
 Hon Sarah Elizabeth Cameron Corbett (born 5 April 1949)
 Hon Anne Mary Cameron Corbett (born 3 September 1953)
 Hon Rosalind Eleanor Cameron Corbett (born 2 January 1958)

The couple divorced in 1961.

Second marriage

In November 1960, Corbett met April Ashley, a successful fashion model, who appeared in Vogue (photographed by David Bailey) and in the film The Road to Hong Kong, which starred Bing Crosby and Bob Hope. They married in 1963, but the marriage quickly broke down.

Ashley's lawyers wrote to Corbett in 1966 demanding maintenance payments and in 1967 Corbett responded by filing suit to have the marriage annulled. The annulment was granted in 1970 on the grounds that Ashley was male, even though Corbett knew about her history when they married. The argument was accepted, and the case served as a precedent until the Gender Recognition Act 2004.

Later life and death
Corbett later moved to Marbella, Spain, where he died after undergoing surgery on his leg for gangrene on 24 June 1993, at the age of 73.

Arms

References

1919 births
1993 deaths
People educated at Eton College
Barons in the Peerage of the United Kingdom
Royal Artillery officers
British Army personnel of World War II
Transgender law in the United Kingdom